State Prison in Ringe was built in 1976 and is a closed prison near the town of Ringe in the country of Denmark. The prison's seven departments have a total capacity of 86 and receives both men and women from across the country from the age of 23 years to the age 29 years who must endure punishment in a closed prison.

State Prison in Ringe is also the only closed prison in Denmark, which has a large outdoor area for each department, which prisoners are free to use whenever they want. The male inmates are mostly convicted for violence and robbery, while the female inmates are often convicted of drug trafficking.

Ringe
Government buildings completed in 1976
1976 establishments in Denmark